Pool of Radiance: Attack on Myth Drannor is an adventure module for the 3rd edition of the Dungeons & Dragons fantasy role-playing game.

Plot summary
Pool of Radiance: Attack on Myth Drannor takes place in the Forgotten Realms setting.  The Cult of the Dragon has built a secret stronghold in the ruins of Myth Drannor, and seeks to subjugate Faerûn using the power of a corrupted pool of radiance.

Publication history
Pool of Radiance: Attack on Myth Drannor was published in 2000, and was written by Sean K Reynolds, with cover art by Brom and interior art by Ted Beargeon and Vince Locke.

Reception

References

Forgotten Realms adventures
Role-playing game supplements introduced in 2000